General elections were held in Japan on 23 January 1949. The result was a landslide victory for the Democratic Liberal Party, which won 269 of the 466 seats. Voter turnout was 74.0%. It was the first election held following the enactment of the current Constitution of Japan.

Future prime ministers Hayato Ikeda and Eisaku Satō and future Foreign Minister and Chief Cabinet Secretary Katsuo Okazaki were first elected in this election.

The second cabinet of Prime Minister Shigeru Yoshida was formed following the election.

Results

By prefecture

References 

Japan
1949 elections in Japan
General elections in Japan
January 1949 events in Asia
Election and referendum articles with incomplete results